Azygophleps larseni is a moth in the family Cossidae. It is found throughout the Arabian Peninsula.

References

Moths described in 2011
Azygophleps
Moths of the Arabian Peninsula
Moths of the Middle East